Llugaj is a village and a former municipality in the Kukës County, northern Albania. At the 2015 local government reform it became a subdivision of the municipality Tropojë. The population at the 2011 census was 1,787.

References

Former municipalities in Kukës County
Administrative units of Tropojë
Villages in Kukës County